In Scandinavian folklore, a rå  (pl rår), is a spirit who is the keeper or warden of a particular location or landform. The rå is known both in Nordic culture and in the Sami culture, where it is called radie.

It was important for humans to cultivate good relationships with them, since they had power over the natural forces and animals under their care, and could cause both good and bad luck for humans who interfered with the places and creatures under their watch.

Types of rår
The different species of rår are sometimes distinguished according to the different spheres of nature with which each was associated, such as skogsrå or hulder (forest), sjörå (freshwater) or havsrå (saltwater), and bergsrå (mountains).

In accordance with old belief systems, every object, animal, and plant had its own rå or spirit which protected it. A rå could also have jurisdiction over places and items owned by humans, such as skeppsrået (rå of the ship) and gruvrået (rå of the mine).

Gender
Though specific individual rår depicted in folklore, such as the skogsrå and the bergsrå, were typically described as female, in general the rår could be both masculine and feminine.

See also 
 Animism
 Dryad
 Kami
 Mermaid
 Naiad
 Tutelary deity
 Vættir, for nature spirits and even gods in Norse mythology and religion

References 

Scandinavian legendary creatures
Scandinavian folklore
Norwegian folklore
Swedish folklore
Nature spirits